Philippe Brach is the stage name of Philippe Bouchard (born July 22, 1989), a Canadian singer-songwriter from Saguenay, Quebec.

Launching his music career in 2012, he was the winner of the Francouvertes festival in 2014. Several weeks later, he released his debut album La foire et l'ordre. He won the Prix Félix for Revelation of the Year in 2015.

His second album, Portraits de famine, followed in 2015, and his third, Le silence des troupeaux, was released in 2017. He was a SOCAN Songwriting Prize nominee in 2016 for "Crystel" from Portraits de famine, and in 2018 for "La fin du monde" from Le silence des troupeaux, and Le silence de troupeaux was longlisted for the 2018 Polaris Music Prize.

He is a frequent collaborator with singer and songwriter Klô Pelgag, including on the duets "Si proche et si loin à la fois" from Portraits de famine and a cover of Richard Desjardins's "Les Yankees" for the tribute album Hommage à Desjardins.

At the Juno Awards of 2019, Le silence des troupeaux was shortlisted for the Juno Award for Francophone Album of the Year.

References

Canadian male singer-songwriters
Canadian singer-songwriters
Canadian pop singers
Living people
Musicians from Saguenay, Quebec
Canadian folk rock musicians
French-language singers of Canada
1989 births
21st-century Canadian male singers